Silene chlorantha is a species of flowering plant belonging to the family Caryophyllaceae.

Its native range is Europe to Central Asia.

References

chlorantha